Marjo may refer to:

 Marjo (singer), Canadian singer-songwriter, given name Marjolène
 Marjo (name), Finnish and Dutch given name

See also
 Marijo